Radisson Hotels is an international hotel chain headquartered in the United States. A division of the Radisson Hotel Group, it operates the brands Radisson Blu,  Radisson Red, Radisson Collection, Country Inn & Suites, and Park Inn by Radisson, among others.

In June 2022, Radisson Hotels agreed to be purchased by Choice Hotels for $675 million. The deal closed on August 11, 2022.

History
In 1907, Edna Dickerson came to Minneapolis, Minnesota, from Chicago to collect a substantial inheritance. Local business leaders persuaded her to build a hotel in the city, with Dickerson investing $1.5 million in the construction of the first Radisson hotel. It was planned as a high-end luxury hotel, designed in the French Renaissance architecture style, and constructed with "the best in every line" of paints, enamels, woodwork, and wood finishes, and named after the 17th-century French explorer, ranger and furrier Pierre-Esprit Radisson. The building was sixteen storeys, making it the second-tallest building in Minneapolis at the time. As the opening neared, reports boasted of hand-carved walnut furnishings in guest rooms and Spanish leather chairs in the main lobby and banquet hall. The hotel opened on Wednesday, December 15, 1909, with many of the staff having been hired from large hotels on the Eastern seaboard, and being new to the city of Minneapolis. The opening was followed shortly thereafter by a charity ball for the city being held at the hotel. In an early hotel incident the following month, six waiters from New York were fired, allegedly "because the Eastern waiters could not get accustomed to the Western ways", with three of them being thrown out "into the street before they would leave".

Dickerson and her husband, attorney Simon Kruse, lived on the hotel's thirteenth floor and managed the hotel, also opening a Radisson Inn on Christmas Lake, in the Minneapolis suburb of Excelsior. They remained for twenty-five years, until 1934, when the Radisson fell into the hands of a mortgage company. In the mid- and late-1940s, pianist Liberace "gained national exposure through his performance contracts with the Statler and Radisson" hotels. Another owner initiated a renovation of the hotel in the late 1940s. The Radisson was purchased in 1962 by the Carlson Company, and it began adding new locations, both through the purchase of existing hotels such as the Denver Hyatt House in 1968, and constructing new buildings in Bloomington, Minnesota, and Duluth, Minnesota. The chain had 14 locations by 1976, and 32 by 1984. The original Radisson in Minneapolis was demolished in 1982, with a new hotel being constructed in that city and beginning operations in 1987. Carlson expanded the chain into one of the top hotel corporations by 2013. On top of Radisson, Carlson also owned several other brands, such as Park Inn, Park Plaza (acquired in 2000), and Country Inns & Suites (founded by Carlson in 1986).

In the 1990s, American-Russian businessman Paul Tatum was murdered after a series of disagreements over the Radisson Hotel in Moscow. 

On June 13, 2022, the company agreed to be purchased by Choice Hotels for $675 million.

Brands

Radisson

The majority of Radisson-branded hotels are located in the United States. The company's headquarters, as well as the headquarters of the owner, Radisson Hospitality, Inc., are located in Minnetonka, Minnesota, a suburb of Minneapolis, the city where the first Radisson Hotel was built. The original Radisson Hotel, opened in 1909, was at 41 South Seventh Street in Minneapolis.

Radisson Blu

Radisson Blu is an international chain of upscale hotels. Its hotels are mainly located in major cities, key airport gateways and leisure destinations. Radisson Blu has roots dating back to the opening of the SAS Royal Hotel in Denmark in 1960 and was the world's first designer hotel. After several name changes, spin offs, and rebranding, the Radisson Blu brand name was established in 2009.

Radisson Blu Edwardian Hotels is a line of luxury hotels in London and Manchester, owned by Edwardian Hotels and often operating in historic buildings: Some of its hotels include the Radisson Blu Edwardian, Heathrow and the Radisson Blu Edwardian, Hampshire.

Radisson Red 

Radisson Red is a chain of full-service hotels operating in the United States and internationally. Radisson Red is an upscale hotel with emphasis on modern design and technology. As of 2019, the brand has twenty-three hotels either in operation or under development.

Radisson Collection
Radisson Collection was formerly known as Quorvus Collection from 2014 to 2018. Quorvus Collection was introduced in 2014 as a luxury brand. The first hotel of former Rezidor Hotel Group in Copenhagen, was converted to use Radisson Collection brand.

Country Inn & Suites by Radisson

Country Inn & Suites by Radisson (formerly Country Inns & Suites) is a hotel chain which accommodates business and leisure travelers. Locations are mainly independently owned and operated, and franchised under licensing agreements with Radisson Hotels. The chain was established as Country Inn & Suites by former Carlson Hotels' owner, Carlson Companies in 1986 as a "middle-class" brand. Carlson Companies also owned the namesake, Country Kitchen restaurant chain at that time. In January 2018, two years after Carlson sold Carlson–Rezidor hotel group to HNA Group, the chain was rebranded into "Country Inn & Suites by Radisson".

Park Inn by Radisson

Park Inn by Radisson is a midscale hotel group. It is described as an "affordable hotel for business and leisure travelers." According to U.S. News & World Report, it offers "comfortable, contemporary accommodations and on-site restaurants."

Radisson Rewards

Radisson Rewards is a loyalty program launched by Radisson Hotels in 1999. It allows guests to earn and redeem points for free nights at Radisson properties.

See also
 Meridian Gate, Cardiff, a skyscraper owned and occupied by Radisson Blu 
 Tour du Crédit Lyonnais, a skyscraper partly occupied by Radisson Blu

References

External links

 

 
Hotels established in 1909
Hotel chains in the United States
1909 establishments in Minnesota
Radisson Hotel Group brands
2022 mergers and acquisitions